James Walter Carter (December 15, 1923 in Aiken, SC – September 21, 1994) was an American world lightweight boxing champion three times between 1951 and 1955. His managers included Jimmy Roche and Willie Ketchum. He was inducted into the International Boxing Hall of Fame in 2000. Carter's loss to Lauro Salas in 1952 and his loss to Paddy DeMarco in 1954 were each named Ring Magazine upset of the year. His professional record was 80-31-9 with 32 knockouts.

Early life
James Walter Carter was born on December 15, 1923 in Aiken, South Carolina, but his family moved to New York when he was nine.  Carter began to use his fists defending himself on the streets of Harlem, but later received training at a Catholic Boys Club, making his amateur debut at the age of fourteen. Beginning as a professional fighter in New York in 1946, he won 22 of his first 26 fights.

First taking the World Lightweight Championship, May 1951

On May 25, 1951, Carter took the World Lightweight Championship from reigning champion Ike Williams in a fourteenth-round TKO at Madison Square Garden. Williams was down in the fifth, tenth, and fourteenth rounds. Carter knocked Williams to the mat a total of four times, and was leading the scorecards of all three officials before the bout was stopped. In the fifth round, Williams was dropped to the canvas for a five count, and never was the same. Surprisingly, Carter was not at all well known at the time of the bout, and his victory was considered an upset.

In his first title defense before 7,251 fans on November 14, 1951 he went up against Art Aragon at the Olympic Stadium in Los Angeles, winning in a fifteen-round unanimous decision. Aragon was down in both the sixth and fifteenth rounds, but claimed after the fight that a left to his jaw in the twelfth is what finally did him in. It was an easy win for Carter, as Aragon lacked the skills to take down the world champion. Aragon took a severe beating in the last four rounds that sealed the victory for Carter. Carter had oddly lost to Aragon on August 28 of that year in a fifteen-round split decision at the same location. Some boxing writers speculated he may have thrown the fight on purpose. Some even believed Carter was controlled by mafia kingpin Frankie Carbo.

He lost the title on May 14, 1952 against Lauro Salas at the Olympic Auditorium in Los Angeles in a fifteen-round split decision that was a jarring upset for many. The decision was a controversial one, and many boxing writers disagreed with the official' final ruling for Sales.

Taking the World Lightweight Championship for the second time, October 1952
Carter took the World Lightweight Championship for a second time on October 15, 1952 against Mexican national Lauro Salas in a fifteen around unanimous decision at the Chicago Stadium before a small crowd of 5,283. In a sweeping victory, which saw far more damage to Salas, the officials gave all but two of the rounds to Carter and his terrific left hook.

On April 24, 1953, he staged a title defense against Tommy Collins before a substantial crowd of 12,477 at Boston Garden, winning in a fourth-round TKO.   Collins' corner men ended the fight after their boxer had been knocked to the canvas ten times in the final two rounds. Both the TV audience and the crowd, who were largely fans of Collins, protested the continuation of such a brutal, and one sided bout.   He next fought George Araujo on June 12, 1953 in a lightweight world title bout at Madison Square Garden, winning in a thirteenth-round TKO.

On March 5, 1954, Carter lost his second World Lightweight Championship against Paddy DeMarco in a fifteen-round unanimous decision at New York's Madison Square Garden. DeMarco, a 4–1, underdog won the decision with ease rocking the crowd of 5,730 with a remarkable upset.  Carter tried for a knockout throughout the bout, but DeMarco scored continuously with fleet footwork and a punishing left. Both judges gave DeMarco nine rounds, with the referee giving him seven.

Taking the World Lightweight Championship for third and final time, November 1954
On November 17, 1954, Carter took the lightweight championship back from Paddy DeMarco in a fifteen-round TKO at the Cow Palace, in Daily City, California. DeMarco was down in the ninth and fourteenth rounds. Carter had lost his title to DeMarco only seven months earlier.

Carter lost the title for the last time to Wallace "Bud" Smith at Boston Garden in a fifteen-round split decision on June 29, 1955. Though the bout was close, Carter took one of the worst beatings of his career from Smith requiring fifteen stitches over his eyes. Smith himself needed three stitches to fix a cut over his own eye. The crowd of only 1,983 saw a razor close, hotly contested title match. Two of the officials gave a margin of only one point between the two boxers.

Carter died of a heart attack on September 21, 1994, at the age of 70.

Professional boxing record

Achievements

See also

Lineal championship
List of lightweight boxing champions

Notes

References
Cyber Boxing Zone's Carter page

External links
 
https://boxrec.com/media/index.php/National_Boxing_Association%27s_Quarterly_Ratings:_1951
https://boxrec.com/media/index.php/National_Boxing_Association%27s_Quarterly_Ratings:_1952
https://boxrec.com/media/index.php/National_Boxing_Association%27s_Quarterly_Ratings:_1953
https://boxrec.com/media/index.php/National_Boxing_Association%27s_Quarterly_Ratings:_1954
https://boxrec.com/media/index.php/National_Boxing_Association%27s_Quarterly_Ratings:_1955
 https://titlehistories.com/boxing/na/usa/ny/nysac-l.html

1923 births
1994 deaths
Boxers from South Carolina
World lightweight boxing champions
International Boxing Hall of Fame inductees
Sportspeople from Aiken, South Carolina
American male boxers
African-American boxers
20th-century African-American sportspeople